Soorarai Pottru is a 2020 Indian Tamil-language drama film written and directed by Sudha Kongara, and co-produced by Suriya, Jyothika and Guneet Monga. Kongara and Shalini Usha Nair wrote the screenplay; Aalif Surti and Ganeshaa provided additional screenplay; and Vijay Kumar and P. Virumandi, wrote the dialogue. The film stars Suriya, Aparna Balamurali and Paresh Rawal; and Mohan Babu, Urvashi and Karunas appear in supporting roles.

The film was inspired by events from the life of G. R. Gopinath, founder of Indian low-cost airline Simplifly Deccan, as described in his memoir Simply Fly: A Deccan Odyssey. The project was announced in mid-2018 under the working title Suriya 38 and the official title was announced in April 2019. Principal photography began the same month and ended that September, and filming took place in Madurai, Chennai, and Chandigarh. G. V. Prakash Kumar composed the film's music while Niketh Bommireddy was the cinematographer and Sathish Suriya edited the film.

The theatrical release of the film was affected by post-production delays and the COVID-19 pandemic; it was released digitally through Amazon Prime Video on 12 November 2020, the eve of the Diwali festival, and simultaneously its dubbed versions in Malayalam and Kannada were released under the same title, and a Telugu dub was released as Aakasam Nee Haddu Raa. A Hindi-dubbed version titled Udaan was released on 4 April 2021.

Soorarai Pottru received critical  acclaim, with praise for the film's major technical aspects and appreciation for the writing, Suriya's performance and Kongara's direction. It was selected as one of ten Indian films to be screened in the category Best Foreign Film at the 78th Golden Globe Awards. The film also entered the Panorama Section of the Shanghai International Film Festival. It won five awards at the 68th National Film Awards: Best Feature Film, Best Actor (Suriya), Best Actress (Aparna), Best Screenplay (Kongara and Nair) and Best Background Score (Prakash Kumar). In November 2022, a Hindi remake, again directed by Kongara and produced by Suriya, was in production with Rawal reprising his role.

Plot 
Nedumaaran Rajangam, nicknamed "Maara", is a former Indian Air Force captain who dreams of starting a low-cost carrier airline. He idolises Paresh Goswami, the owner of Jaz Airlines. One day, Maara is visited by Sundari, who is nicknamed  Bommi, whose family is looking for a groom for her. Bommi is a fiery young woman who wants to open her own bakery. Maara is impressed by Bommi's nature and agrees to marry her. He tells her that he grew up as a rebellious boy and had a difficult and contentious relationship with his father. Maara joined the Indian Air Force where he excelled but was often reprimanded by his superior, M. Naidu due to his rebellious nature. When his father was on his deathbed, Maara tried to book a flight home but he did not have enough money. He asks several people at the airport to help him out financially, to no avail. When he reaches his house after a long journey by road and train, he discovers that his father has died and his last rites have occurred. This event sparked Maara's ambition to start a low-cost carrier airline. Bommi, however, rejects him saying that she and Maara are already wedded to their respective ambitions.

Maara visits Naidu to ask for the ex-serviceman loan so he can start his airline but Naidu refuses. With no other option, Maara travels on the same flight as Paresh. He proposes that they work together to start a low-cost carrier. Paresh, however, believes the poor should not travel with the rich and humiliates Maara. Prakash Babu, the head of a venture capital firm overhears Maara's conversation with Paresh and asks him to explain his business plan to the firm's board. Meanwhile, Maara and Bommi start meeting each other frequently and eventually get married. He plans to lease Boeing aircraft from PlaneAm, who have agreed to lease them at low prices. After his funds get sanctioned, Maara tries to meet with Directorate General of Civil Aviation (DGCA) officials to acquire the license but they disregard him. Maara then meets the President of India and requests his help in getting the license.

Irked by his progress, Paresh uses his power to pass a law that requires Boeing to submit its airline blueprints to fly in Indian airspace. PlaneAm cancels the lease and demands a penalty fee. Maara requests Prakash to loan him money to pay the penalty but he refuses. Prakash reveals he was working with Paresh, with whom he conspired to bring Maara down, and that Jaz Airlines has acquired the aircraft instead. Infuriated, Maara storms into Paresh's office but is tackled by the guards. He becomes short-tempered and often quarrels with Bommi but later apologises. He realises that he can fly smaller aircraft and strikes a deal with a Turboprop aircraft manufacturer. Paresh, fearing Maara may affect his business, decides to take matters into his own hands. Meanwhile, Maara's entire village helps him by donating as much money as they can. He plans to commence flight operations from airstrips that have been abandoned since the major airports came under Paresh's control. He names his airline Deccan Air, and sells tickets at railway stations and petrol pumps. Retired Air Force pilots are hired to fly the aircraft and Bommi wins the bid for in-flight catering.

On the day of the delivery of the aircraft, Paresh uses his influence to restrict the flight's landing at Chennai, forcing the flight to crash-land at Tambaram Air Force Station due to lack of fuel. Naidu summons Maara to explain the emergency landing and lets him off with a fine. The airline's maiden flight catches fire and is forced to abort its take-off. It is revealed that Paresh had bribed the captain to sabotage the flight. The captain admits his mistakes in front of the inquiry panel. Vimal Balaiyya, a prominent businessman, offers to buy Deccan Air but Maara refuses, citing differences in their vision. Paresh starts a smear campaign against Deccan Air in the hopes of ending Maara's dreams but Maara assures everyone that his flights are safe and cost-effective. On the day of the start of operations, however, no passengers check in for one flight. Maara is about to give up when he is informed that a technical error resulted in no tickets for that particular flight being booked, whereas all other flights are fully booked. With tears of happiness in his eyes, Maara watches the other flights touch down. Paresh later calls Maara and offers to work with him but Maara rejects the offer, saying farmers have flown and will continue to fly, and that Paresh does not own the sky. Paresh accepts defeat as Deccan Air becomes a success.

In a mid-credits scene, the Civil Aviation Minister of India summons Paresh to Delhi, reprimands him for sabotaging Deccan Air's inaugural flight and threatens to shut down Jaz Airlines. In a restroom, Paresh has an anxiety attack and tries to take his pill but it falls to the floor. A janitor picks the pill up for Paresh, inducing in him a sense of respect for lower-income groups.

Cast 
Adapted from the closing credits:

 Suriya as Nedumaaran "Maara" Rajangam
 Aparna Balamurali as Sundari "Bommi" Nedumaaran
 Paresh Rawal as Paresh Goswami
 Mohan Babu as M. Bhaktavatsalam Naidu
 Urvashi as Pechi Rajangam
 Karunas as Alapparai
 Poo Ramu as Rajangam
 Krishnakumar as Chaitanya "Che" Rao
 Vivek Prasanna as Sebastian
 Kaali Venkat as Kaali
 Vinodhini Vaidyanathan as Chitra Ramaswamy
 Prakash Belawadi as Prakash Babu
 Achyuth Kumar as Anantha Narayanan
 Dan Dhanoa as Vimal Balaiyya
 R. S. Shivaji as Anantha Narayanan's PA
 Ramachandran Durairaj as Arivu
 G. Gnanasambandam as Chinnaswamy
 Vishalini as Muthulakshmi
 Supergood Subramani as a marriage broker
 RJ Anandhi as a stewardess
 Priya Prince as Seby's wife
 Cassendra as Preethi
 Ilan as Seby's son
 Iyal as Seby's daughter
 Udumalai Kalam as the President of India
 Somasekar as an IAF cadet
 Senthil Kumar as himself (uncredited)

Production

Development 

In late 2009, Sudha Kongara conceptualised a film based on Simply Fly: A Deccan Odyssey by Simplifly Deccan founder-and-entrepreneur G. R. Gopinath when she assisted Mani Ratnam during the production of Raavanan (2010). Kongara did extensive research for the script for more than ten years, while also working on the direction of Drohi (2010), and Irudhi Suttru and its Telugu remake Guru (2017). During the audio launch of Irudhi Suttru, Sudha met Suriya, who attended the event as a guest and narrated one line of the script. Suriya decided to start working on the film after his acting commitments in 24 and Si3 while Sudha started working on Guru.

After completing Guru, Sudha again met Suriya in his residence in February 2017 to hand over the half-completed script. Suriya was impressed by the narration and story, and agreed to appear in and produce the project. Suriya wanted no-one to interfere in the film's budget or to change any sequence. He was also concerned about the film's quality and believed producing the project could let him handle the supervision. Because the proposed budget was considerably higher than expected, Suriya approached producer Guneet Monga to substantially fund the film under the Sikhya Entertainment banner, which was known for producing critically acclaimed films such as The Lunchbox (2013), Masaan (2015) and the Academy Award-winning documentary film Period. End of Sentence. (2018). The company agreed to fund the project, which became its first South Indian film. The film was officially announced in April 2018 with the tentative title Suriya 38.

Pre-production work on the film began in June 2018, and filming was speculated to start in November but was postponed because of delays in pre-production. G. V. Prakash Kumar was selected to work on the film's music; Kumar worked with director Sudha and actor Suriya for the first time. The film's technical crew were cinematographer Niketh Bommireddy, and Sathish Suriya, who edited the director's Irudhi Suttru and Guru and was production designer on Jacki. Sudha confirmed the film is not a biopic of Gopinath but was inspired by events in his life. Kongara made changes to the script and screenplay to suit the film's real-life events. On 13 April 2019, the title was revealed with a poster release as Soorarai Pottru.

Casting 

Suriya played the role of Nedumaaran Rajangam (Maara), an ambitious man from Madurai; the character is loosely based on G. R. Gopinath. Sudha hired two or three assistant directors and writers from Madurai, to speak in Madurai dialect. Suriya said his character "is prone to anger ... Even in anger, he is able to think of why certain people are coming from a different perspective. He knows how to behave with his wife, his friends and others". Sudha fixed these elements before filming to make the performance look consistent. He also did few physical transformations; For scenes of the character as a young man, Suriya had lost almost  to gain physique for the role; he also underwent a strict dietary regime by eating cucumbers.

The film has 96 characters because the story tracks the protagonist's life from birth and many characters have importance despite their limited screen time. Aparna Balamurali was signed to play the female lead, working with Suriya for the first time. Her character Sundari was modelled on Gopinath's wife Bhargavi. Balamurali also learnt the Madurai dialect for the film. In June 2019, Telugu actor Mohan Babu was signed to play a senior officer named Bhakthavatsalam Naidu. He immediately accepted the role when approached, and dubbed in his own voice. Soorarai Pottru is also the acting debut of Arjunan's son Ilan and daughter Iyal.

Bollywood actor Paresh Rawal was cast as the antagonist Paresh Goswami, making his Tamil debut. The character is based on Naresh Goyal, CEO of Jet Airways. Dan Dhanoa appeared in a short role as Vimal Balaiyya, which was inspired by Indian businessman Vijay Mallya. Sheik Maideen, who had a close resemblance to former president of India A. P. J. Abdul Kalam and was popularly known as "Udumalai Kalam", played the character inspired by Kalam; Maideen's voice was dubbed by Naveen Muralidhar. R. Madhavan gave the narration for the film.

Filming 

Principal photography on Soorarai Pottru began on 8 April 2019. The team began filming for the first schedule, which was completed on 16 April 2019 and took place in Tamil Nadu. The second schedule began on 23 April 2019 at Chandigarh and finished on 6 June 2019. During this schedule, an action sequence was filmed using multiple cameras fitted in a car; this sequence was choreographed by Hollywood stuntman Greg Powell. Scenes were filmed on a specially constructed set resembling the interior and exterior of an aircraft the was designed by art director Jacki. Cinematographer Niketh Bommireddy said the crew used hand-held cameras during the principal shooting session because most of the film was shot in closed interiors.

The third schedule of the film started on 14 June 2019, when scenes featuring Mohan Babu and Paresh Rawal were filmed. Rawal completed his scenes the following month. Also in July, the crew went to Hyderabad to film major sequences. A month-long schedule took place in August, during which some important scenes were filmed in Madurai and surrounding locations. It marked Suriya's return to filming in Madurai after Pithamagan (2003). During the schedule, Suriya organised a meet with fans, around 800 of whom met Suriya during the shoot. The crew later returned to Chennai, where they erected a building at a location near Chennai International Airport to hide the runway from view.

Ecept for a few minor scenes, filming on the project ended on 27 September 2019. Suriya delivered gold coins to the film's crew members after completing the shoot. The entire film was completed within 60 working days.

Post-production 
Post-production on Soorarat Pottru began in January 2020, shortly after the end of filming, but it was suspended in March following the COVID-19 pandemic. Post-production resumed on 11 May 2020 after the Tamil Nadu government granted permission provided workers followed COVID-19 guidelines. In early June, the Central Board of Film Certification granted a U certificate for the film without cuts, and praised Suriya's performance. The censor board report was released in August; the film's final runtime is 153 minutes and offensive words in the film were muted. The film was scheduled for a direct-to-digital release, the official runtime was trimmed to 149 minutes and cuss words were not censored. The film's deleted scenes were released on 19 February 2021, coinciding with the film's 100th-day run), by the production house through YouTube.

Music 

G. V. Prakash Kumar worked on the film's score and soundtrack; in April 2019, before filming commenced, he recorded a song in collaboration with the band Thaikkudam Bridge for a rock number in the film. Singers Dhee, Senthil Ganesh and Harish Sivaramakrishnan of the band Agam also contributed to the album. Prakash worked on the film's background score in October 2019. The following month, Prakash announced Suriya will perform the rap versions of the film's theme music, which is titled "Maara Theme". The song marked his third time as a singer after he sang in Anjaan (2014) and the unreleased film Party.  Sony Music India released the film's soundtrack album on 24 July 2020.

Release

Streaming 
Soorarai Pottru had been scheduled to release on Christmas Day, 25 December 2019; it was postponed until to Pongal, 15 January. Due to pending post-production work, the film's theatrical release was again postponed, this time to 1 May, and was then indefinitely delayed because of the COVID-19 pandemic. On 1 May that year on social media, Suriya stated the film would be scheduled for a theatrical release. On 22 August 2020, coinciding with  Ganesh Chaturthi, Suriya announced the film would have a direct-to-digital release on Amazon Prime Video on 30 October 2020, and the theatrical release was cancelled. Suriya stated this decision was made because his production house 2D Entertainment had been facing financial difficulties due to the pandemic and had 8-10 projects to be produced; he also said he took his decision as a producer, not as an actor, and had to safeguard his projects and the crew working in the films. In an interview with HuffPost, Suriya said: "I am able to maintain all the families of those working in those projects because I took the OTT route. That cheque saved families, and that's all I see right now".

The direct-to-digital release announcement disappointed many of Suriya's fans, who wanted to watch the film in theatres, and they asked him to reconsider his decision. Suriya faced a similar controversy when he released his film Ponmagal Vandhal (2020) on the same streaming platform; it became the first Tamil film to be digitally released during the pandemic, and Suriya received pushback from theatre owners and exhibitors for his decision. Director Hari wrote to Suriya, asking him to reconsider the decision of releasing the film digitally, while Bharathiraja defended him and welcomed his decision, stating it was the correct move for the situation. Rajasekar Pandian, the executive producer of 2D Entertainment, stated the film would be premiered by streaming in 200 countries. Suriya further announced 50 million from the film's profits would be donated to film-industry workers and frontline workers who made necessary efforts to control the pandemic.

A week prior to the film's release date, 21 October 2020, Suriya announced that the film would again be postponed due to a delay in obtaining the No Objection Certificate (NOC) from the IAF. The makers announced a new release date of 12 November 2020, the eve of Diwali festival. Soorarai Pottru was released in Tamil, Telugu, Malayalam and Kannada languages; the Telugu version was titled Aakasam Nee Haddhu Ra, and Satyadev Kancharana provided dubbing for Suriya's character. A Hindi-dubbed version titled Udaan was released on 4 April 2021.

Marketing 
As part of the film's promotional strategy, the production company announced they would partner with Indian budget airline SpiceJet, whose chairman  Ajay Singh launched his company's Boeing 737 aircraft with a Soorarai Pottru poster branded on it on 13 February 2020. The same day, the second single of the film's soundtrack was launched on the same aircraft. This was the third time a passenger jet had been used to advertise an Indian film, after AirAsia India for Kabali (2016) and SpiceJet for Darbar (2020). The making-of Soorarai Pottru documentary was released on 14 April 2020, Tamil New Year's Day. Fans appreciated Suriya's dedication and hard work for the film featured in the making-of video.

Prior to the film's release, Suriya launched a huge space balloon with a special poster at the highest possible altitude. The first-of-a-kind promotional activity went viral on social media platforms and the Internet. A Twitter emoji for the film was launched before its release.

Home media 
The satellite television rights of the film's Tamil, Telugu, Malayalam and Kannada versions were sold to the Sun TV Network. The film's television premiere took place on Sun TV on 14 January 2021, the day of the Pongal festival.

Theatrical re-release 

Soorarai Pottru was planned for theatrical re-release on 23 August 2021, when theatres were allowed to resume operations after closure due to a surge in COVID-19 cases in Tamil Nadu. This decision was planned after the film was screened at Sathyam Cinemas in Chennai for the Chennai International Film Festival in February 2021. After the positive response during its first theatrical screening, the makers planned a theatrical re-release. 2D Entertainment had planned to screen the film on a free-distribution basis in which the profits earned would be handed to theatre owners. The plan was abandoned when Tamil Nadu Theatre Owners Association (TNTOA) decided not to screen films that were released through digital platforms. In December 2021, however, fans of Suriya announced the film would be re-released in theatres across Kerala from mid-December 2021 until January 2022. Owing to the response in Kerala, the production company reinstated the decision to re-release it in a limited number of theatres in Tamil Nadu on 4 February 2022.

Reception

Critical response 
Soorarai Pottru received critical acclaim. Writing for The Hindu, Srinivasa Ramanujam said: "Director Sudha Kongara delivers a well-knit cinematic tale that urges us to follow our dreams ... The intensity of proceedings does soften in the second half, when somehow, things seem to fall too quickly in place, with help pouring in from unexpected quarters for the protagonist. However, Suriya as Maara holds the show together". Ranjani Krishnakumar from Firstpost gave the film a rating of four-and-a-half out of five and said; "Sudha Kongara, Suriya tell a moving, poetic biopic without deifying the leading man". Karthik Keramalu from The Quint gave the film a rating of three-and-a-half out of five, calling it a "comeback" for Suriya after the less-positively received works NGK and Kaappaan", adding: "Soorarai Pottru largely works, as it is about a larger-than-life dream than one particular person. I'm not denying that it is based on GR Gopinath's life, but the dramatic events that have carefully been picked from his tall tale are about a handful and director Sudha Kongara has glued them well with enough grit to sustain the proceedings".

M. Suganth of The Times of India gave a rating of three-and-a-half out of five, stating:
Right from the start, the film shows us how the nexus between capitalists and bureaucrats has been instrumental in crushing anyone who dares to dream big, after a point, the hurdles that Maara has to cross begin to feel repetitive, making the film seem a bit overlong. But the closing visuals of the joy on the faces of the common folk who take the flight on Maara's aircraft ensure a smooth touchdown".

According to Sudhir Srinivasan from The New Indian Express; "It's a film with character purpose across the board, incisive dialogues, great performances, and much empathy and sensitivity to boot. Soorarai Pottru is the whole package really. It can be said that in charting the life of this man who wanted millions to soar, the film too has managed to".

Logesh Balachandran of India Today gave three-and-a-half stars out of five, saying; "There is a tautness to the storytelling, especially until the interval, that keeps us gripped. The second half, however, lacked that substance which was built in the first half of the film. Sudha could have done a little more research on other aviation stories and incorporated them into the script. That said, the performance of Suriya is what holds the entire film together". Balachandran said the film "was made for the theatrical experience and would have been an amazing watch on the big screen", and concluded "the OTT release has given the makers of the film a wider reach". Gauthaman Bhaskaran of News18 gave the film two-and-a-half stars out of five and stated; "Soorarai Pottru could have been far more inspiring and even engrossing had director Sudha Kongara done away with unnecessary songs and emotions. Her plane would have had a smoother flight sans the turbulence". According to Sify, which gave the film four stars out of five; "Soorarai Pottru stands out with its fine writing and outstanding performance of Suriya".

Sowmya Rajendran, editor-in-chief of The News Minute gave four out of five and stated; "Suriya is in fine form, switching between angry young man to conflicted son, romantic husband and cussing businessman  ... Soorarai Pottru is easily Suriya's best outing in a long time. It's a pleasant flight even if there's some turbulence along the way". Critic Shubhra Gupta of The Indian Express gave two out of five and stated; "Soorarai Pottru is marred by the high-pitched melodrama whistled up every time the script needs to create fan-pleasing moments. Given Suriya's mega popularity, that is an always present temptation, and the film gives in, much too often." Writing for Hindustan Times, Haricharan Pudipeddi said; "Soorarai Pottru, which will go down as one of the best films of the year, is Suriya's return to form (after a few mediocre films) and it's quite gutsy of a mainstream hero to produce and star in a film that doesn't tick all those boxes of a typical commercial entertainer". Baradwaj Rangan wrote for Film Companion; "In terms of sheer professionalism, the film is the best thing that's come on the southern OTT space".

Accolades 

Soorarai Pottru was selected as one of ten Indian films to be screened in the Best Foreign Film category at the 78th Golden Globe Awards. On 26 January 2021, the film's executive producer Rajasekar Pandian announced Soorarai Pottru had been entered into the 93rd Academy Awards, for Best Actor, Best Actress, Best Director, Best Original Score and other categories. He also said it has been made available to members of the Academy of Motion Picture Arts and Sciences for votes and nomination at the Academy Screening Room. The film was one of 366 films that were eligible for nomination but it was not nominated. Soorarai Pottru was also screened at the Chennai International Film Festival. The film also entered the Panorama section of the Shanghai International Film Festival. It won two awards at the Indian Film Festival of Melbourne – including Best Film and Best Actor (Suriya). It was nominated in 14 categories at the 10th South Indian International Movie Awards and won seven awards. At the 68th National Film Awards, Soorarai Pottru won five awards: Best Feature Film, Best Actor (Suriya), Best Actress (Aparna), Best Original Screenplay (Kongara and Nair) and Best Background Score (Prakash Kumar).

Impact 

Soorarai Pottru received positive response from celebrities including director Shankar, actors Mahesh Babu, and Samantha Ruth Prabhu, all of whom praised the film. The film became the second-most-tweeted hashtag of the year in entertainment sections, according to a survey report by Twitter. The film also became the second-most-searched topic in Google Trends, becoming the only South Indian film to appear in this list. As of February 2021, Soorarai Pottru is the most-watched regional language film in the history of Amazon Prime Video in India.

Remake 
Soorarai Pottru is being remade in Hindi; again directed by Kongara and produced by Suriya and Vikram Malhotra. It stars Akshay Kumar and Radhika Madan, with Paresh Rawal reprising his role.

Suriya appears in a cameo role. G. V. Prakash Kumar was retained as composer to score new soundtrack. Principal photography commenced in April 2022.

References

External links 
 

2020 direct-to-video films
2020 drama films
2020 films
A. P. J. Abdul Kalam
Amazon Prime Video original films
Best Feature Film National Film Award winners
Drama films based on actual events
Films about aviators
Films based on autobiographies
Films based on memoirs
Films directed by Sudha Kongara
Films featuring a Best Actor National Award-winning performance
Films featuring a Best Actress National Award-winning performance
Films not released in theaters due to the COVID-19 pandemic
Films postponed due to the COVID-19 pandemic
Films scored by G. V. Prakash Kumar
Films shot in Chandigarh
Films shot in Hyderabad, India
Films shot in Madurai
Films shot in Tiruchirappalli
Films whose writer won the Best Original Screenplay National Film Award
Indian Air Force in films
Indian aviation films
Indian direct-to-video films
Indian drama films
Indian films based on actual events
Indian nonlinear narrative films
Tamil films remade in other languages